Heliomeroides is a trilobite in the order Phacopida (family Cheiruridae), that existed during the upper Ordovician in what is now the United States. It was described by Evitt in 1951, and the type species is Heliomeroides teres. The type locality was the Lincolnshire Formation in Virginia.

Species
 Heliomeroides alacer Whittington, 1963
 Heliomeroides evitti Baldis & Pothe, 1995
 Heliomeroides freschaufae Chatterton, 1980
 Heliomeroides raymondi (Bradley, 1930) - Originally assigned to Heliomera, and later moved to its current genus by Evitt in 1951.
 Heliomeroides teres Evitt, 1951 - Type species.
 Heliomeroides treta Evitt, 1951

References

External links
 Heliomeroides at the Paleobiology Database

Cheiruridae
Fossil taxa described in 1951
Ordovician trilobites
Extinct animals of the United States
Paleozoic life of Newfoundland and Labrador
Paleozoic life of the Northwest Territories
Phacopida genera